The 1992 Muratti Time Indoor, known as such for sponsorship reasons, was a men's tennis tournament played on indoor carpet courts at the Assago Forum in Milan, Italy that was part of the ATP World Series of the 1992 ATP Tour. It was the 15th edition of the tournament and was held from 3 February until 9 February 1992. Unseeded Omar Camporese won the singles title.

Finals

Singles
 Omar Camporese defeated  Goran Ivanišević, 3–6, 6–3, 6–4
 It was Camporese's first singles title of the year and the second and last of his career.

Doubles
 Neil Broad /  David Macpherson defeated  Sergio Casal /  Emilio Sánchez, 5–7, 7–5, 6–4

References

External links
 ITF tournament edition details

Milan Indoor
Milan Indoor
Milan Indoor
Milan Indoor